Events in the year 2022 in Dominica.

Incumbents 

 President: Charles Savarin
 Prime Minister: Roosevelt Skerrit

Events 
Ongoing — COVID-19 pandemic in Dominica

Sports 

 Dominica at the 2022 Commonwealth Games
 Dominica at the 2022 World Athletics Championships

Deaths 

 23 January – Bryson Joseph Louis, politician (born 1925)

References 

 
2020s in Dominica
Years of the 21st century in Dominica
Dominica
Dominica